Charthawal is a city and a nagar panchayat in Muzaffarnagar district in the state of Uttar Pradesh, India. It acts as the administrator of 59 surrounding villages.

Demographics
As of the 2001 Indian census, Charthawal had a population of 31,493. Males constituted 53% of the population and females 47%. Charthawal had an average literacy rate of 51%, lower than the national average of 59.5%, with male literacy at 59% and female literacy at 42%. 19% of the population is under 6 years of age.

There are several Kashyap villages in Charthaval. Kashyap villages include Balwakheri, Biralai, Dhudhli, Pilakhni, Badh, Alipura, Pipalshah, Pipalhera, Roni Harjipur, Manganpur, Kacholi, Kasoli  Chaoukada, and Bhamela. Tyagi villages include Khushropur, Chaukada, Ghisukheda, Nyamu, and Kishanpur Majra.

History
Charthawal is listed in the Ain-i-Akbari of the Mughal Empire as a pargana under the sarkar of Saharanpur, producing a revenue of 1,668,882 dams for the imperial treasury and supplying a force of 200 infantry and 20 cavalry.

Education
There are many schools and colleges in Charthawal, including:
 Jai hind Inter College
 Maharaja Agrasen Girls Degree College
 Gandhi Inter College
 Chandra Shekhar Azad Degree College
 Abul Kalam Azad Inter College
 Gandhi Balika High School
 Arya Kanya Inter College
 Acharya Abhay Dev Public School
 Sri Aurovindo Vidya Niketan
 Nalanda Public School
 Saraswati Vidhya Mandir
 Gandhi Shishu Niketan
 Bal Vidhya Mandir
 Adarsh Public High School
 Primary School
 Tasmia Public School 
 Islamia Public School
 Kids Heaven Public School (Play to 8th)
 Kids Heaven High School

Religion 

Charthawal contains large populations of both Hindus and Muslims.

Hinduism 
Several Hindu temples are based in Charthawal, including Thakurdwara, which was built in the thirteenth century. In 1910, this temple was repaired by one of the wazirs, a family member of Mughal Emperor Shahjahan. Another significant temple is Sidhpeeth Devi Mandir. Many people worship Navaratri at this temple. Thirdly, there is an old Bharo Mandir in Murdapati Charthawal, which people visit every Saturday. Locals believe that their wishes will be fulfilled if they visit this temple, and many people visit it in the month of Asadh. Finally, there is a shiv mandir where exists a natural Shivling where a large number of people visit in Sawan.

Islam 
There are many mosques in Charthaval, with two considered the oldest. One of them, known as Jama Masjid Tagayan, is situated at Sheikh Garvi (west) (غركى). It was supposedly built by the Mughal emperor फिरोज शाह तुगलक (मुताबिक 786 हिजरी) in the 17th century. The other mosque, Jama Masjid (also known as 'Amina Masjid' Sheikhzadgan near Hakim Nazar Ahsan), is located at Sheikhzadgan Sharki (east) (شركى) and is approximately 360 years old. The University of Islamic Studies Darul Uloom Deoband is twenty kilometers away from Charthawal.

Business 
There are two sugar cane crushers and small-scale sugar cane plants (Kolhu) in Charthaval. These produce Jagerry (Gurh in Urdu/Hindi) after processing sugar cane juice. They produce from October to May and net a hundred million Indian rupees in revenue each season. Bajaj Hindusthan Limited, Titawi Sugar Mill and Rohana Sugar Refinery companies are based in the town.

Charthawal is also known for its wholesale wood market. The town features more than 10 wholesale shops for wood, which purchase eucalyptus, poplar, teak, sheesham and other logs from farmers and sell them to plywood manufacturers. The wood market of Charthawal generates between one and two million rupees of revenue per day.

References

Cities and towns in Muzaffarnagar district